Tarzam (also Romanized as Ţarzam and Ţarzom) is a village in Arzil Rural District, Kharvana District, Varzaqan County, East Azerbaijan Province, Iran. At the 2006 census, its population was 816, in 184 families.

References 

Towns and villages in Varzaqan County